The Interzone Mantras is the sixth album by Canadian rock group The Tea Party, released in 2001. Named after William S. Burroughs' book of short stories Interzone and the band's interest in eastern mysticism and esoteric philosophies, the songwriting on The Interzone Mantras builds on the subtle electronica and ballads of Triptych, whilst returning to the familiar territory of their earlier albums with 1970s rock and world music influences. Jeff Martin explained that the album was a return to basics:
"The last two records, Transmission and Triptych, were very much creations of the studio - meticulously built. With this record we felt that we wanted to put a spark of passion underneath our asses.

"So many people have told us that we're this great live rock band, and I just wanted to see if, as producer, I could capture that on this record. I put us in a rehearsal space, the three of us, faced each other with just guitar, bass and drums - no toys - and, you know, 'let's Rock!'" The new approach fired the band up to such an extent that the album was recorded in just twenty days - "unheard of" for The Tea Party, Martin says.

Martin has special praise for drummer Jeff Burrows, who he proudly proclaims to be "THE best rock drummer going", and who did every drum track in one take.

Lyrically the album draws from the works of modern writers Aleister Crowley, Mikhail Bulgakov, Wim Wenders, to ancient Greek mythology (Morpheus on "Lullaby"). The lyrics themselves written by Martin when holidaying in Prague, after the music was written from jams in the band's rehearsal space.

The Interzone Mantras sold 17,300 copies in Canada in its first week. The first 100,000 Canadian copies of the album were packaged with a special lenticular cover, with Alessandro Bavari's depiction of Shiva moving depending on the viewing angle. Although not as commercially successful as previous albums, The Interzone Mantras is The Tea Party's highest charting album in Australia (debuting at #6 on the ARIA chart) and is certified Gold in Canada. It was also nominated for "Rock Album of the Year" at the 2003 Juno Awards.

Notably, it was one of the final albums to be recorded at famous Quebec facility Le Studio before it was shuttered in 2002.

Track listing

Singles
"Lullaby"
"Angels"
"Soulbreaking"

Personnel
Jeff Martin – production and recording
Nick Blagona and Don Hachey – engineering
Recorded at Studio Morin Heights (Morin Heights, Quebec) and Metalworks Studios (Mississauga)
Jeff Martin and Nick Blagona – mixing at Metalworks Studios
Nick Blagona – mastering at Metalworks Mastering
Stuart Chatwood – art direction
Alessandro Bavari – artwork
Antonie Moonen – design
David Giammarco – special thanks

Guests
Marc Oulette – string arrangements
"Soulbreaking", "Requiem", "Mantra"
Joanna Morin and Francois Pilon – 1st violins
Élise Lavoie and Pascale Gagnon – 2nd violins
Brian Bacon and Juie Dupras – violas
Vincent Bernard and Élisabeth Dubé – cellos
"Interzone", "Apathy"
Muhammad Abdul Al Khabyyr – trombone
Jean-Pierre Zanetta – baritone, tenor and soprano saxophones
Maxine St-Pierre – trumpet
Francois D'Amours – tenor and alto saxophone
Paul Atkins – additional percussion on "Interzone", "The Master and Margarita", "Lullaby", and additional vocals and percussion on "Must Must"

Charts

Weekly charts

Year-end charts

References 

2001 albums
The Tea Party albums
EMI Records albums
Albums recorded at Le Studio
Albums recorded at Metalworks Studios